[[File:LophocalotesTiarisFord.jpg|thumb|Tiaris miotympanum (bottom left) is a synonym of Gonocephalus bornensis. From Günther 1872.]]Gonocephalus bornensis'', the Borneo anglehead lizard or Borneo forest dragon, is an agamid lizard endemic to Borneo in Indonesia and Malaysia, and known from Sabah, Kinabalu, Brunei, Sarawak and Kalimantan.

Description
Moderately long (SVL up to 136 mm). Males generally larger than females (SVL= 118-136 vs. 90–130 mm; Tail Length=261-310 vs. 215–275 mm). Circular border on supercilium. Tympanum rather small. Weakly granular dorsum with a prominent lanceolate crest starting on neck and terminating on lower back. Tail is almost cylindrical.

Sub-adult males are generally brown, olive and green on dorsum with laterals, often with dark reticulations. Adult males are predominantly male with indistinct reticulation. Females rust red dorolaterally with oval spots formed from reticulations on the sides of body.

Distribution
Is endemic to Borneo. Found commonly in Mount Kinabalu, Poring Hot Spring in Sabah, also found in Brunei, Sarawak and Kalimantan.

Ecology and Natural History
Found in primary and secondary rainforests up to 700 m a.s.l. Arboreal in habit, they live in tree trunks and on lianas often near streams. They deposit eggs in a small burrow dug on soil. Up to four eggs (length 22 mm each) are laid per clutch at intervals of three months.

References

bornensis
Reptiles described in 1851
Taxa named by Hermann Schlegel
Reptiles of Borneo
Endemic fauna of Borneo